A  or family register is a Japanese family registry. Japanese law requires all Japanese households (basically defined as married couples and their unmarried children) to make notifications of their vital records (such as births, adoptions, deaths, marriages and divorces) to their local authority, which compiles such records encompassing all Japanese citizens within their jurisdiction.

Marriages, divorces by mutual consent, acknowledgements of paternity of non-marital children and adoptions (among others) become legally effective only when such events are recorded in the koseki. Births and deaths become legally effective as they happen, but such events must be filed by family members or other persons as allowed by law. Loss of Japanese or foreign nationalities have to be recorded in the koseki, too.

Format
There are two main types of certified copies of koseki: the Comprehensive Copy of Koseki (戸籍謄本, koseki tōhon) and Selected Copy of Koseki (戸籍抄本, koseki shōhon). The comprehensive koseki is a record of all family members, while the selected koseki is the information for only one individual family member.
  
A typical koseki has one page for the household's parents and their first two children: additional children are recorded on additional pages. Any changes to this information have to be sealed by an official registrar.

The following items are recorded in the koseki.
(Law of Family Register, (戸籍法, kosekihō), articles 9 and 13.)

(header) registered domicile (honseki)
(header) family name and given name of the " head of the koseki", i.e. the first person shown on the koseki. This family name will be shared by all the members of this koseki.
given name
date of birth
date of records and causes (marriage, death, adoption, etc.)
names of natural parents (except when it is a plenary adoption)
if adopted, names of the adoptive father and mother
if married, whether the person is a husband or a wife
if transferred from another koseki, the former koseki
other matters as specified by ordinance, such as matters pertaining to naturalization if the person or his/her spouse is a naturalized Japanese national.

History
This census was introduced under the ritsuryō system of governance. The shūmon jinbetsu aratamechō was created around 1670 and lasted almost 200 years. It combined social and religious registration, and data was renewed annually. Several categories of outcasts were not registered at all under this system, or were registered in specific registers, for instance the burakumin. The modern koseki, encompassing all of Japan's citizenry, appeared in 1872, immediately following the Meiji Restoration. This was the first time in history that all Japanese people were required to have family names as well as given names. Although all previous social categories were abolished and almost all Japanese people were recorded as heimin (commoners), some minorities became labelled as "new commoner" or "original eta" (shinheimin or motoeta), and discrimination went on. Problems also happened at the edge of the national territory, for instance in the Ogasawara Islands.

During the course of the Japanese Empire, a number of reforms were carried out after 1910 to eliminate double standards in the koseki system. In general, though, residents of the Empire's colonies held external registries (gaichi koseki) (based on the preexisting Hoju) and Japanese held domestic registries (naichi koseki).

After the full revision of the Family Register Act in 1947 (enforced the following year), the household, known as "ie" were redefined to a narrower scope (married couples and their unmarried children), thus limiting the maximum number of generations under the same koseki to two generations.

In 2003, the "GID Law" was enacted, enabling people with "gender identity disorder" (GID) or gender dysphoria to change their gender on their koseki provided they meet certain conditions. Persons diagnosed with GID must seek an official diagnosis with letters of support from two independent psychiatrists to change their koseki gender. A person with functional reproductive glands or a married person cannot change their koseki gender.

Imperial family 

Members of the Imperial Household of Japan are registered not in a koseki but in a Register of Imperial Lineage (皇統譜, kōtōfu) instead, according to Article 26 of the Imperial House Law.　The Register of Imperial Lineage is composed of the Taitōfu which handles matters related the emperor and the empress, and the Kōzokufu which handles matters related to the other members of the Imperial Household.

Citizenship 
Only Japanese citizens have a koseki. If one parent is Japanese, then the child is eligible for Japanese citizenship, hence a Japanese passport. So, the koseki doubles as a certificate of citizenship (a proof of Japanese nationality). Non-Japanese may be noted where required, such as being the spouse of a Japanese citizen or the parent of a Japanese offspring; however, they are not listed in the same fashion as Japanese spouses or parents  since being a regular member of a koseki is a sufficient condition to be a Japanese national.

When a person is naturalized to Japan (authorized by the Minister of Justice and properly noticed through the Official Gazette), this person has to declare the creation of a new koseki or join her/his Japanese spouse's koseki within one month after the notice. Besides, any loss of a foreign nationality that was not already lost before the naturalization date should be registered on the koseki within one month from the date of learning the fact of loss of foreign nationality (Family Register Act, article 103).

Address history and domicile transfers 
The koseki system is different from the jūminhyō residency registration, which holds current address information of both Japanese and foreign nationals. For Japanese nationals, their residency registration is linked with their koseki. Each residency change is reported by the municipality in which the person actually lives to the honseki-chi (the municipality of the registered domicile), which records the residency history on a supplementary page called koseki no fuhyō. Koseki thus serves as the record of all the address history. Addresses abroad are also included, through the Overseas Residential Registration.

It is possible to transfer a koseki from one registered domicile to another. Any domiciliation is possible within the boundaries of the Japanese territory. After a transfer, some of the information shown on the preceding koseki, including the history of addresses, are not transcribed to the new one. But it is still possible to return to the previous koseki information because the preceding koseki domicile and name is always noted, allowing traceability. A koseki is supposed to be kept at least 150 years by the municipality in charge, even after all its members have passed away, been transferred to other koseki or have lost their Japanese nationality.

Privacy concerns and other criticisms 
Information provided in koseki is detailed and sensitive and makes discrimination possible against such groups as burakumin or illegitimate children and unwed mothers, for example. As the burakumin liberation movement gained strength in postwar Japan some changes were made to family registries. In 1974 a notice that prohibited employers from asking prospective employees to show their family registry was released by the Ministry of Health and Welfare. In 1975 one's lineage name was deleted and in 1976 access to family registries was restricted. As of April 2007, anyone interested was eligible to get a copy of someone else's koseki. However, on May 1, 2008, a new law was implemented to limit the persons eligible for a copy to the persons whose names are recorded in a given koseki and those who need such a copy to exercise their due rights (debt collectors, executors of wills). Anyone who is listed on a koseki, even if their name has been crossed off by reason of divorce and even if they are not a Japanese citizen, is eligible to get a copy of that koseki. One can obtain a copy in person or by mail. Lawyers can also obtain copies of any koseki if a person listed is involved in legal proceedings.

The koseki simultaneously fills the function of birth certificates, death certificates, marriage licenses, and the census in other countries. It is based on family rather than each individual. For married couples, only one family name may appear on the koseki, which means that one person has to abandon his or her family name when he or she marries. Usually it is the woman. On December 15, 2015, the Nikkei Asian Review reported that Japan's Supreme Court upheld a legal provision forcing married couples to use the same surname. Plaintiffs had argued that the legal provision amounts to "de facto discrimination against women."

Another concern is where children are not registered on the koseki. The onus is on the parents to register the child however there have been cases where this has not happened. 

In September 2010, the Japanese government completed research into 230,000 "missing" persons age 100 years old or more. Some journalists claimed koseki is an antiquated system that enabled younger family members to receive the pensions of deceased elderly relatives.

Koseki tends to be criticized by commentators or activists situated on the left wing of the Japanese political spectrum, because its rigid framework functions as a barrier against societal innovations, and because the history of any citizen is easily searchable. On the contrary, other views praise the state-of-the-art reliability and traceability offered by this system for more than 150 years.

Family registries in other nations
A similar registration system exists within the public administration structures of all East Asian states influenced by the ancient Chinese system of government. The local pronunciations of the name of the household register varies, but all are derived from the same Chinese characters as that for koseki (in traditional ). These states include People's Republic of China (hukou), Republic of China (Taiwan) (hùjí), and in  North Korea (hoju, hojeok, hojok). In South Korea, the hoju system was abolished in 2008.

See also 

 Alien registration in Japan
 Birth certificate
 Hukou
 Propiska in the Soviet Union
 Resident registration in Russia

References

External links
 "Overview of the koseki Family Registration System" on Japan Children's Rights Network site, April 2007

Civil registries
Japanese family registers
Japanese family structure
Japanese words and phrases
Law of Japan

ja:戸籍#日本